The women's 4 x 400 metres relay event at the 2002 European Athletics Indoor Championships was held on March 3, 2002.

Results

References
 Results

4 × 400 metres relay at the European Athletics Indoor Championships
400
2002 in women's athletics